Kalikadevi Tempal. Mukkunda is a village in the Sindhanur taluk of the Raichur district in Karnataka, India. It is located on the banks of the Tungabhadra river. Mukkunda has several ancient temples, including the Sri Rama mandir shri dhurgamma temple, the Murari Ranga, and the Baajeshwara. The Tungabhadra river surrounds an Eshwara temple built in Hoysala style during the Sindha dynasty. A Sufi saint, 
hazrat gadde Khadar Bhasha darga  Mukkunda is well known, and many visitors from surrounding village will come to take the blessings of this saint. It is and 27 km from Karnataka State Highway 19. The nearest towns are Siruguppa and Karatagi.

Demographics
 India census, Mukkunda had a population of 3,111 with 1,571 males and 1,540 females and 590 Households.

See also
 Salagunda
 Roudakunda
 Maski
 Kanakagiri
 Raichur

References

Villages in Raichur district